The Williamsport Armory is a historic National Guard armory located at 1300 Penn Street in Williamsport, Pennsylvania.  It consists of a main armory building and separate auxiliary building.  The main armory building has a two-story, brick administration section in the Art Deco style, with an attached drill hall, taking a "T"-shaped plan.  The drill hall was built in 1937.  The auxiliary building was built in 1927.  It consists of a -story stable with an attached 1-story gun shed.

The complex was added to the National Register of Historic Places in 1991.

See also

National Register of Historic Places listings in Lycoming County, Pennsylvania

References

External links

Armories on the National Register of Historic Places in Pennsylvania
Art Deco architecture in Pennsylvania
Infrastructure completed in 1927
Buildings and structures in Williamsport, Pennsylvania
National Register of Historic Places in Lycoming County, Pennsylvania